The Nepaug River begins at the confluence of North Nepaug Brook and Cedar Swamp Brook about  east of Bakerville, Connecticut.

This river run is between Class I-II whitewater until the U.S. Route 202 bridge. The river then enters the Nepaug Reservoir at the northwest corner.

The final section of the Nepaug River carries the overflow from the Nepaug Dam east to the Farmington River at Collinsville (near Cherry Brook, Connecticut). The Reservoir is managed by the Metropolitan District Commission.

See also
List of rivers of Connecticut

References

External links
 Connecticut Explorer's Guide Online paddling map of the Nepaug River

Rivers of Connecticut
Rivers of Litchfield County, Connecticut
Rivers of Hartford County, Connecticut
Tributaries of the Connecticut River
Connecticut placenames of Native American origin